The Henry and Mary Heyrman House is located in De Pere, Wisconsin.

History
The house was built for newspaperman Henry Heyrman and his wife, Mary. For several decades, the couple resided in the house and their seven children lived there along the way as well. In 2014, it was added to the State Register of Historic Places. The next year, it was listed on the National Register of Historic Places.

References

Houses on the National Register of Historic Places in Wisconsin
National Register of Historic Places in Brown County, Wisconsin
Queen Anne architecture in Wisconsin
Houses completed in 1903